Pipenzolate bromide is a pharmaceutical drug that has been studied as an antispasmodic agent and to treat peptic ulcer.

Mechanism of action
Pipenzolate bromide acts as an antimuscarinic agent. It binds to muscarinic acetylcholine receptors as an antagonist therefore preventing acetylcholine from binding to the receptors.

References

Muscarinic antagonists
Quaternary ammonium compounds
Piperidines
Tertiary alcohols